Emma Treiberg (born 19 November 2000) is an Estonian footballer who plays as a forward for Tallinna Kalev and the Estonia women's national team.

Career
She made her debut for the Estonia national team on 27 February 2019 against Malta, coming on as a substitute for Gerli Israel.

References

2000 births
Living people
Women's association football forwards
Estonian women's footballers
Estonia women's international footballers
JK Tallinna Kalev (women) players
Footballers from Tallinn